The Dangbe language, also Dangbe or Adaŋgbi, is a Kwa language spoken in south-eastern Ghana by the Dangbe People (Dangbeli). The Dangbeli are part of the larger Ga-Dangbe ethnic group. Klogbi is a variant, spoken by the Kloli (Klo or Krobo People). Kropp Dakubu (1987) is the most thorough grammar of the language.

Classification
Dangme is a Kwa language, part of the Niger–Congo family. It is closely related to Ga, and together they form the Ga–Dangme branch within Kwa.

Geographic distribution
Dangme is spoken in Ghana by over 800,000 people as of 2004.

It is the aboriginal language spoken in Ghana, Togo, Benin by the people of Ada, Osudoku, Manya Krobo, Yilo Krobo, Shai, Ningo, Prampram and Kpone. Dangme is partly mutually intelligible with Ga, and, to a lesser extent, Ewe. Nevertheless, many Dangme people also speak or understand at least one of these languages, painting the relationship as asymmetric. Dangme as a school subject is taught in the Dangme areas.
 
The land of these related tribes stretched from the Greater Accra Region to the Eastern Region of Ghana, northward to the Akwapim hills and has all the Dangmeland on the east and the Ga to the west of it. Bawaleshi, which is about 4.8 kilometers southwest of Dodowa, is the last Dangme town which is close to the Akwapim and the Ga boundaries.
There are six main dialects which coincide with political units. The coastal dialects are Ada, Ningo and Prampram (Gbugbla). The inland dialects are Shai (Sɛ), Krobo (Klo) and Osudoku.

Phonology

Consonants

  are bilabial, whereas  are labiodental.
  are singly articulated plosives,  are affricates (stops with a strong fricative release), whereas  are doubly articulated plosives.
  varies between a lateral approximant  and a central trill .
  has a fricative allophone .

Vowels

Adangme has 7 oral vowels and 5 nasal vowels.

 The front vowels are unrounded, whereas the back vowels are rounded.
  are close-mid . They do not have nasal counterparts.
  are open-mid , whereas  are somewhat lower (near-open) .
 The nasal  is open front , whereas the oral  is slightly retracted (near-front) .

Tones
Adangme has three tones: high, mid and low. Like many West African languages, it has tone terracing.

Phonotactics

Writing system
Adangme is written in the Latin script. Tones and nasalisation are not normally written.

Orthographic and phonemic correspondences include the following:
 j - 
 ng - 
 ngm - 
 ny - 
 ts - 
 y - 
 ɛ - 
 ɔ -

References

Bibliography

External links
 My First GaDangme Dictionary kasahorow
 Universal Declaration of Human Rights in Dangme
 Lessons in Wikiversity
 Listen to a sample of Adangbe from Global Recordings Network
 Listen to a sample of Adangme from Global Recordings Network

Languages of Ghana
Ga–Dangme languages